Maurice Hartt,  (April 15, 1895 – March 15, 1950) was a Romanian-born Canadian politician.

Born in Dorohoi, Romania, the son of Saul Hartt and Malia Segal, he immigrated to Canada when he was twelve. He studied law at Queen's University and was called to the Quebec Bar in 1935. He was created a King's Counsel in 1942 and practiced law in Montreal. He was elected to the Legislative Assembly of Quebec in the riding of Montréal–Saint-Louis in 1939. A Liberal, he was re-elected in 1944. He resigned in 1947, when he was elected to the House of Commons of Canada in the riding of Cartier in a 1947 by-election called when Fred Rose's seat was declared vacant by a resolution of the House of Commons. A federal Liberal, he was re-elected in 1949. He died in office in 1950.

His son, Stanley Hartt, was Prime Minister Brian Mulroney's Chief of Staff from 1989 to 1990. Another son, Joel Hartt (1940–2009), was a professor of Humanities at John Abbott College and Chairman of the Lakeshore School Board.

References
 
 

1895 births
1950 deaths
Romanian Jews
Jewish Canadian politicians
Liberal Party of Canada MPs
Members of the House of Commons of Canada from Quebec
Quebec Liberal Party MNAs
Queen's University at Kingston alumni
Canadian people of Romanian-Jewish descent
Lawyers in Quebec
Canadian King's Counsel
Romanian emigrants to Canada